is a railway station in Kure, Hiroshima Prefecture, Japan.

Lines
West Japan Railway Company
Kure Line

Adjacent stations

|-
!colspan=5|JR West

History 
Kure-Portopia station opened on 19 March 1992.

References 

Railway stations in Hiroshima Prefecture
Railway stations in Japan opened in 1992